The 2015–16 Australian region cyclone season was the least active Australian region cyclone season since reliable records started during 1969, with only three named tropical cyclones developing in the region. Reasons for the low activity during the year included a positive Indian Ocean Dipole occurring and the 2014–16 El Niño event. Ahead of the season starting; the Australian Bureau of Meteorology predicted that there was a 91% chance that the season would be below average. As the 2015–16 tropical cyclone year opened on 1 July 2015, the newly named Tropical Cyclone Raquel moved south-westward into the Australian region. Over the next couple of days, the system meandered around 160°E and moved through the Solomon Islands, before it was last noted on 5 July. The basin subsequently remained quiet with only several weak tropical lows developing, before the first named tropical cyclone of the season was named Stan during 29 January 2016.

Stan subsequently made landfall on Western Australia and impacted various commodities including oil, natural gas and iron ore. However, impacts were limited due to the low population of the region. The precursor tropical low to Tropical Cyclone Uriah developed over the Indian Ocean, within a monsoon trough of low pressure during 9 February. The system subsequently developed further and was named Uriah during 13 February, before it moved out of the region during the following day. Tropical Cyclone Tatiana developed into a tropical cyclone, during 11 February while it was located over the Coral Sea. Over the next few days, the system remained over water and dissipated during 15 February after it had produced some powerful, long period swells along Queensland beaches. After Tatiana dissipated four tropical lows occurred in the region, before the season ended on 30 April, including the remnant tropical low of Severe Tropical Cyclone Winston.

Seasonal forecasts

Ahead of the cyclone season, the FMS, the BoM, Météo-France, New Zealand's MetService and National Institute of Water and Atmospheric Research (NIWA) and various other Pacific Meteorological services, all contributed towards the Island Climate Update tropical cyclone outlook that was released during October 2015. The outlook took into account the strong El Niño conditions that had been observed across the Pacific and analogue seasons that had ENSO neutral and weak El Niño conditions occurring during the season. The outlook called for an above average number of tropical cyclones for the 2015–16 season, with eleven to thirteen named tropical cyclones to occur between 135°E and 120°W compared to an average of 10–12. At least six of the tropical cyclones were expected to become category 3 severe tropical cyclones, while four could become category 4 severe tropical cyclones.

In addition to contributing towards the Island Climate Update outlook, the BoM issued seven seasonal forecasts during October 2015, for the Australian region and the Southern Pacific with each forecast covering the whole tropical cyclone year. It was forecast that the region would less active than during previous years, with a 91% chance of a below average amount of tropical cyclones, because of the strong El Niño episode that had developed over the Pacific Ocean. It was also noted that the first tropical cyclone landfall might be later than usual, with the average first landfall taking place in January during El Niño conditions. For the Western region between 90°E and 125°E, the BoM forecast that the area would also see activity below its average of 7, with a 25% chance of an above average number of tropical cyclones occurring. TCWC Perth also noted that there was a likelihood of two tropical cyclones and a significant likelihood of at least one severe tropical cyclone impacting Western Australia. For the North-Western subregion between 105°E and 130°E, it was predicted that activity would be below average, with a 15% chance of above average tropical cyclone activity. The Northern Territory which was defined as being between as being 125°E and 142.5°E had a 36% chance of an above average season. The Eastern region between 142.5°E and 160°E was predicted to have a near normal tropical cyclone season, though it was noted that there was a possibility of a delayed start to the season. The BoM issued a seasonal forecast for both the Western and Eastern South Pacific. The Western region between 142.5°E and 165°E was predicted to have a 15% chance of having an above average number of tropical cyclones, while the Eastern region between 165°E and 120°W was predicted to have a 48% chance of having an above average number of tropical cyclones.

Seasonal summary

During the season only three tropical cyclones developed within the Australian region, which meant that the season was considered to be the least active season since reliable records started in 1969. This low activity was partially attributed to the 2014–16 El Niño event, which caused systems to be displaced eastwards into the South Pacific tropical cyclone basin. A positive Indian Ocean Dipole event caused cooler-than-normal waters in tropical eastern Indian Ocean, near Indonesia, which in turn limited development near Western Australia during the first part of the season. As the 2015–16 tropical cyclone year opened on 1 July 2015, the newly named Tropical Cyclone Raquel moved south-westward into the Australian region. Over the next couple of days, the system meandered around 160°E and moved through the Solomon Islands, before it was last noted on 5 July. The basin subsequently remained quiet with only several weak tropical lows developing, before the first named tropical cyclone of the season was named Stan during 29 January 2016.

Stan subsequently made landfall on Western Australia and impacted various commodities including oil, natural gas, and iron ore. However, impacts were limited due to the low population of the region. The precursor tropical low to Tropical Cyclone Uriah developed over the Indian Ocean, within a monsoon trough of low pressure during 9 February. The system subsequently developed further and was named Uriah during 13 February, before it moved out of the region during the following day. Tropical Cyclone Tatiana developed into a tropical cyclone, during 11 February while it was located over the Coral Sea. Over the next few days, the system remained over water and dissipated during 15 February after it had produced some powerful, long period swells along Queensland beaches. After Tatiana dissipated four tropical lows occurred in the region before the season ended on 30 April, including the remnant tropical low of Severe Tropical Cyclone Winston.

Systems

Tropical Low 04U

On 16 December, TCWC Perth mentioned that a tropical low may develop northwest of Christmas Island. The agency declared to be a tropical low by the next day when it was producing convection in its area. TCWC Perth forecast the low would intensify to a tropical cyclone and move into the Western Region by 24 hours on 21 December. The low was later designated as 04U on 23 December, however, this was the last advisory issued by TCWC Perth and rapidly dissipated overnight.

Tropical Low 05U

Tropical Low 05U developed over land near Borroloola in the Northern Territory during 21 December. Over the next couple of days, the system gradually deepened further as it moved west-northwest inland and passed near Daly Waters and Katherine. The system subsequently approached Darwin during 24 December, where it was causing near gale-force winds offshore. On 26 December, 05U was embedded within a monsoon, giving a potential of intensifying into a tropical cyclone. A couple of days later, 05U drifted southeastwards towards land and failed to reach tropical cyclone intensity. The system was last noted on 2 January while it was located over the Simpson Desert in Queensland, as it was not clear if the low continued towards the east coast or another system had developed.

Tropical Cyclone Stan

The system was located within a favorable environment for further development and was forecast to develop into a tropical cyclone over the next couple of days, as it moved southwards towards the coast of Western Australia. 08U was subsequently declared a Category 1 tropical cyclone on 29 January and was named Stan by the BoM. Stan continued to intensify during the day as it slowly moved in a southeast direction towards the east Pilbara coast. Stan reached category 2 tropical cyclone strength at 8:00 pm AWST time, when it was located 280 km north of Port Hedland. Stan maintained category 2 strength during the course of 30 January. Category 1 strength hurricane-force winds formed around 9:30 am AWST the same day, near Rowley Shoales where Stan was 100 km south of the island. Stan crossed the east Pilbara coast between Port Headland and Wallal as a strong category 2 tropical cyclone at 2:00 am AWST. Stan proceeded to weaken while moving inland, becoming a category 1 tropical cyclone at 8:00 am the same day, and further weakened to become a tropical low at 2:00 pm that afternoon. The remnants of Stan caused record breaking rain in South Australia. Coffin Bay received 75.8mm of rain, The Nullarbor received 62.4mm, and Port Lincoln received 49.6mm of rainfall.

Tropical Cyclone Uriah

Tropical Cyclone Tatiana

The system was located within a favorable environment for further development, with the low-level circulation center gradually consolidating, while deep atmospheric convection wrapped into the system. Over the next couple of days, the system gradually developed further as it moved eastwards before the JTWC initiated advisories on the system and designated it as Tropical Cyclone 12P during 10 February. Over the next day, the system continued to develop and was named Tatiana by the BoM, as it developed into a Category 1 tropical cyclone.

By this time Tatiana had started to move towards the east-southeast under the combined influence of the monsoon flow and a trough of low pressure. The system subsequently peaked as a Category 2 tropical cyclone with 10-minute sustained winds of  during 12 February, before it moved just out of the Australian region and into the South Pacific basin. The system subsequently moved southwards and rapidly weakened during the next day, before it lost its tropical characteristics and degenerated into a subtropical low during 14 February, as the storm moved back into the Australian Basin. After the system had degenerated into a subtropical low, it produced some powerful, long period swells along southeast Queensland beaches.

Tropical Low 12U

Tropical Low 14U

Tropical Low 14U developed within a monsoon trough near Vanderlin Island, in the southern Gulf of Carpentaria, on 14 March.

Other systems
On 1 July, as the 2015–16 tropical cyclone year opened, the newly named Tropical Cyclone Raquel moved southwestward into the Australian region. During that day the system started to move eastwards in response to the background westerly flow before it weakened below tropical cyclone intensity as it moved back into the South Pacific basin during July 2. The system subsequently moved back into the Australian region during 4 July, as it moved through the Solomon Islands. The system was subsequently last noted by the BoM to the southwest of Guadalcanal, on 5 July, as it rapidly lost its tropical characteristics.

A low-pressure developed east of the 90th meridian east or the border of the basin on 26 December, and had a moderate chance of intensifying into a tropical cyclone. TCWC Perth later classified it as a weak tropical low with the identifier of 06U. On 28 December, as the low slowly moved south, unfavorable environments hinder the chance of being a cyclone. TCWC Perth made its final bulletin of the tropical low as it slowly drifted west on 29 December. Over the next couple of days, the system moved north-eastwards and tried to develop further in a marginally conducive environment for further development. However, the system weakened on 21 January, before it was last noted on 24 January, as it was not expected to develop into a tropical cyclone. During 14 February a weak tropical low lied in an area of marginal conditions for further develop near Christmas Island. Over the next couple of days, environmental conditions surrounding the system became less favorable for further development, before the system was last noted during 16 February.
During 26 February, Winston entered the basin as an extratropical cyclone, whilst the JTWC classified it as a subtropical cyclone; ultimately, it made landfall over Queensland as a tropical low and quickly degenerated into a trough, on 3 March.

Storm names
There has only been one list that the Bureau of Meteorology have assigned names to tropical cyclones since the 2008–09 season. Tropical cyclones named by the TCWC Jakarta and Port Moresby are rare, with the last named cyclones occurring during 2014 and 2007, respectively. Retired and its replacement names have not yet been confirmed.

Season effects

|-
| 04U ||  || bgcolor=#|Tropical low || bgcolor=#||| bgcolor=#| || None || None || None || None ||
|-
| 05U ||  || bgcolor=#|Tropical low || bgcolor=#||| bgcolor=#| || Northern Territory, Queensland || None || None || None ||
|-
| 06U ||  || bgcolor=#|Tropical low || bgcolor=#||| bgcolor=#| || None || None || None || None ||
|-
| 07U ||  || bgcolor=#|Tropical low || bgcolor=#||| bgcolor=#| || None || None || None || None ||
|-
| Stan ||  || bgcolor=#|Category 2 tropical cyclone || bgcolor=#| || bgcolor=#| || Western Australia & Southern Australia ||  ||  || || 
|-
| Uriah ||  || bgcolor=#|Category 2 tropical cyclone || bgcolor=#| || bgcolor=#| || Cocos Islands ||  ||  || ||
|-
| Tatiana ||  || bgcolor=#|Category 2 tropical cyclone || bgcolor=#| || bgcolor=#| || Queensland ||  ||  || || 
|-
| 11U ||  || bgcolor=#|Tropical low || bgcolor=#| || bgcolor=#| || None || None || None || None ||
|-
| 12U ||  || bgcolor=#|Tropical low || bgcolor=#| || bgcolor=#| || None || None || None || None ||
|-
| 13U (Winston) ||  || bgcolor=#|Tropical low || bgcolor=#| || bgcolor=#| || Queensland || None || None || None ||
|-
| 14U ||  || bgcolor=#|Tropical low || bgcolor=#| || bgcolor=#| || Northern Territory, Queensland || None || None || None ||
|-

See also

Australian region tropical cyclone
Weather of 2015 and 2016
Tropical cyclones in 2015 and 2016
South Atlantic tropical cyclone
Atlantic hurricane seasons: 2015, 2016
Pacific hurricane seasons: 2015, 2016
Pacific typhoon seasons: 2015, 2016
North Indian Ocean cyclone seasons: 2015, 2016
2015–16 South-West Indian Ocean cyclone season
2015–16 South Pacific cyclone season

Notes

References

External links

 Australian Bureau of Meteorology
 Joint Typhoon Warning Center
 Tropical Cyclone Warning Center Jakarta 
 Digital Typhoon

 
Australian region cyclone seasons
2015 Aus
2016 Aus